Mudlavia Springs is an extinct town that was located in Liberty Township in Warren County, Indiana, west of the town of Kramer.  It was once home to the former Hotel Mudlavia.

Even though the community no longer exists, it is still cited by the USGS.

Geography
Big Pine Creek flows just west of the site.

References

Former populated places in Warren County, Indiana
Ghost towns in Indiana